Mission: Impossible is a 1990 overhead action adventure video game produced by Konami/Ultra Games for the Nintendo Entertainment System based on the second Mission: Impossible TV series.

Plot
The objective of the IMF team is to solve a kidnapping case, as a terrorist group by the name of the Sinister 7 has kidnapped both a well-known scientist and Shannon Reed, another IMF operative. The chase will take place through the canals of Venice to the Swiss Alps, and the team is to infiltrate a number of hostile multiple-floor installations in pursuit of the hostages.

Gameplay
The game is played from a top-down perspective. The player gets to control three IMF operatives from the TV series - Max, Grant and Nicholas - all of whom have different skills necessary for completion. The used character may be switched at any time in-game.

On the street at the very beginning of the game, civilians may not be harmed, and such activities will most certainly bring the mission to a highly embarrassing end, as local authorities proceed to arrest the attacker. While infiltrating an enemy's hideout, discretion is advised as detection by the surveillance system will bring security guards.

Reception

Mean Machines Magazine gave an overall score of 86 out of 100, giving praise to the large game levels and creating a faithful rendition of the tv score, although giving criticism to the drab colors and repeated character blocks concluding “A great Blend of action and adventure which captures the spirit of the tv show well and provides a brill game into the bargain.”

References

External links
Mission: Impossible at MobyGames
Mission: Impossible at GameFAQs

1990 video games
Nintendo Entertainment System games
Nintendo Entertainment System-only games
Konami games
Mission: Impossible video games
Run and gun games
Stealth video games
Top-down video games
Spy video games
Video games set in Moscow
Video games set in Berlin
Video games set in Switzerland
Video games set in Venice
Video games set in Cyprus
Video games developed in Japan
Video games set in the Soviet Union